Lea Salonga: The Christmas Album is a Christmas-themed album by Lea Salonga.

The song "Sana Ngayong Pasko" (English: Hopefully This Christmas) was originally performed by Ariel Rivera.

Track listing 
Mary Did You Know
Grown-Up Christmas List 
Pasko Na Sinta Ko 
The Gift (duet with Michael Lee)  
It's Just Another New Year's Eve 
Sana Ngayong Pasko  
Even Santa Fell In Love 
Merry Christmas, Darling (with The Company) 
The Christmas Song
Twelve Days of Christmas

Charts

Albums

Singles

References

External links
Official site

Lea Salonga albums
2001 Christmas albums
Christmas albums by Filipino artists
Contemporary R&B Christmas albums